"Oh My" is the first single from Gin Wigmore's first studio album, Holy Smoke. The song debuted on the New Zealand Singles Chart at number twenty-one, peaking at number four. It also is the opening song to the New Zealand show, The Almighty Johnsons.  It was certified Gold in New Zealand after ten weeks on the chart, selling over 7,500 copies, then platinum in February 2010, selling over 15,000 copies.

Music video

The music video was released at the iTunes Store on 25 September 2009.

Track listing

Charts

Weekly charts

Year-end charts

Certifications

References

2009 singles
Gin Wigmore songs
2009 songs
Universal Music Group singles